Malik Zidi (born 14 February 1975) is a French film, television and theatre actor. He is a César Award recipient for Most Promising Actor.

Life and career
Malik Zidi was born in Châtenay-Malabry to a Kabyle, Algerian father and a Breton mother. He spent his formative years in Saint-Maur-des-Fossés, a suburb of Paris. Zidi abandoned his conventional studies early to concentrate on a career in comedy. Following courses at the Théâtre Véronique Nordey, and the Théâtre de Proposition in Paris, he briefly studied acrobatics and mime at the Théâtre de la Piscine and cinema at the Studio Pygmalion. Zidi made his first film appearance in the 1998 Sébastien Lifshitz-directed Les Corps ouverts.

In 2000, Zidi was chosen by director François Ozon to appear as the troubled, lovelorn, bisexual youth Franz in the Teddy Award-winning film Water Drops on Burning Rocks (French:Gouttes d'eau sur pierres brûlantes). The film was based on the play Tropfen auf heisse Steine by German film director and screenwriter Rainer Werner Fassbinder. The film is a four-part comedy-drama shot entirely on one set and featuring only four actors: Zidi, Bernard Giraudeau, Ludivine Sagnier and American actress Anna Levine. Zidi's role in Water Drops on Burning Rocks garnered him his first of four César Award nominations.

Malik Zidi followed up with roles in the 2002 Antoine Santana-directed Un moment de bonheur (English: One Moment of Happiness) opposite Isild Le Besco, earning his second César Award nomination for Most Promising Actor. In 2004, he appeared in the André Téchiné-directed romantic drama Les Temps qui changent (English release title: Changing Times) as Sami, the bisexual son of Cécile (portrayed by Catherine Deneuve), who visits his parents in Tangiers so that he may visit his Moroccan boyfriend. The film also starred actor Gérard Depardieu and was nominated for a Satellite Award. Zidi received his third César Award nomination.

In 2006, Zidi appeared in the Emmanuel Bourdieu-drama Les Amitiés maléfiques (English release title: Poison Friends). The film was showcased at the Cannes Film Festival and Bourdieu received the Critics Week Grand Prize and the Grand Golden Rail. The film also won the SACD Screenwriting Award and Zidi was once again nominated for a César Award, winning the Award for Most Promising Actor 2007.

In addition to film, Zidi has appeared in numerous television roles.

In 2020, Zidi penned his first novel L'ombre du soir, which was published by Éditions Anne Carrière.

Personal life
Zidi currently resides in the Ile-de-France. He lists Michel Piccoli and Laurent Terzieff as his "heroes" and is a jazz aficionado.

Filmography

Other awards 
 2001: Berlin International Film Festival - Shooting Stars Award

References

External links

 
 
 Malik Zidi at Rotten Tomatoes
 MySpace
 Adéquat. Agence Artistique (in French)

1975 births
Living people
People from Châtenay-Malabry
Most Promising Actor César Award winners
French male film actors
French people of Breton descent
French people of Kabyle descent
French people of Algerian descent
French male television actors
Chevaliers of the Ordre des Arts et des Lettres
20th-century French male actors
21st-century French male actors